Clara Tauson (born 21 December 2002) is a Danish professional tennis player. In 2016, at age 13, she became the youngest Danish champion in tennis. Caroline Wozniacki held the previous record when she won at age 14. Her career-high rankings are world No. 33 in singles and No. 432 in doubles reached in February 2022. She has won two WTA titles both on hardcourt indoors.

As a junior, she played amateur tournaments from 2013 till 2019 and started mixing this with prize money tournaments in 2017. Her best amateur result was girls' 2019 Australian Open winner. The same year, she became the first Danish girl to top the junior world ranking. On the professional ITF Circuit, she has won nine titles, the first at age 14. Her WTA Tour debut came in April 2019 and her debut in a senior level Grand Slam came at the 2020 French Open. She also represented  Denmark in Fed Cup with a win–loss record of 5–5. She ended her junior years in top 200 on the WTA ranking. 

In 2021, her first year as a senior, she won her two first WTA singles titles at the Lyon Open and at Luxembourg Open on top of one Challenger and two ITF tournament wins. At the same time she broke into top 50 on the WTA rankings. Her 2022 season was marred by injuries, however, she managed to pass her first million US$ in prize money.

Personal life
From 2019 till 2022 she attended Justine Henin's tennis academy in Belgium. Former tennis player Michael Tauson is her uncle.

Career

Overview
Clara Tauson's talent for tennis was discovered when she was six years old. At 10, she left her local school to attend one that would allow her to focus on tennis. In the beginning she was often compared to Caroline Wozniacki, Denmark's best player at the time. She did not find herself to be the same kind of player as Wozniacki, whom she saw as more of a baseline player. Clara Tauson started playing junior tournaments in 2013 age 10. Her family financed her until 2017 when she started playing professional tournaments. In 2019, she became a full time professional. She focuses on singles but has also played doubles tournaments and Fed Cup.

2009-2016: Early career and Danish champion
Tauson started playing tennis at age six. In 2011 she won the U9 tournament at the Zealand championships and the club championship for the U10. In 2014, she became triple Danish U12 champion, winning girls' singles, girls' doubles and mixed doubles with Holger Rune. She debuted on the Tennis Europe junior tour on 26 August 2013. Her first tournament victory came in 2015. In February 2016, Tauson debuted on the ITF Junior Circuit, the premier level for worldwide competition among U18 tennis players. During the year she reached five finals, winning one. In girls' doubles she reached four finals, winning one. In August 2016, aged 13, she won the Danish Tennis Championship, beating Hannah Viller Møller in the final, and breaking the record of Caroline Wozniacki, who won it aged 14. She was awarded Danish Junior Tennis Player of the Year for 2016 for her overall performance.

2017-2020: Junior professionalism and top 200

In 2017, Tauson made her debut for the Denmark Fed Cup team. She lost her doubles but Denmark won the match. At the European Youth Olympic Festival in July, she won the tennis tournament as the top seed. In September she made her Grand Slam debut at the junior competition of US Open but did not make it to the main draw. The same month, she debuted on the professional ITF Women's Circuit. In October, she entered the WTA world-rankings when she reached her first ITF final. The following month, she took her first ITF title. Her biggest victories in 2018 were the European Junior Championship in girls' singles and Osaka Mayor's Cup, her first Grade-A junior tournament win. She got a sponsor contract with Japanese sports equipment producer Yonex. At the end of the year, she won bronze at the ITF Junior Masters.

She played her first Junior Grand Slam main draw at the 2019 Australian Open where she was top-seeded in girls' singles, and won the title—the first Danish girl to do so. The next week, she also became the first Dane to top the girls' singles world ranking. In April 2019, she entered her first WTA Tour tournament on a qualifier's wildcard. She made it to the main draw and lost her first-round match. In May, she played her last amateur tournament becoming a full time professional. In February 2020, she helped bringing Denmark back to Europe/Africa Group I in Fed Cup. Due to the COVID-19 pandemic, her career was put on a hold until August. In September, she broke in to the WTA top 200 for the first time in her career. This allowed her to enter the French Open qualifying. The French Open, which was postponed due to the pandemic, was her first senior level Grand Slam appearance. After winning her qualification matches, Tauson beat world No. 25, Jennifer Brady from the United States, in her first main-draw match before losing in the second round to Danielle Collins, another American.

2021: First WTA titles and top 50
Following wins at two ITF tournaments, Tauson entered the Lyon Open as a qualifier at the end of February. There, she won her first WTA title, beating the top seed Ekaterina Alexandrova en route, and fellow qualifier Viktorija Golubic in the final. With the win, Tauson entered the top 100 for the first time, becoming the second youngest player in the top 100 behind Coco Gauff. The next week, she qualified for her first WTA 500 tournament in St. Petersburg Throphy, before losing to eventual winner Daria Kasatkina in the first round.

At the opening of the clay-court season in April, she was seeded for the first time on the WTA Tour at the Copa Colsanitas. However, she lost to qualifier Daniela Seguel, in the first round. Her next competition was the WTA Charleston 2 event. She reached the quarterfinals but had to retire against Camila Osorio, because of a knee injury. The injury prevented her from participating in the WTA 1000 Madrid Open. Instead, she participated in the Open de Saint-Malo in both singles and double. While she was eliminated early on in the singles, she managed to reach the semifinals in doubles with her partner Aliaksandra Sasnovich from Belarus. In May, she entered the main draw of the French Open, losing to Viktoria Azarenka in the second round.

In July, she entered her first Wimbledon tournament in both singles and doubles. Later that month, she was, due to cancellations, offered a ticket to the Olympic tournament in Tokyo but declined because of an injury. In the run-up to the US Open, Clara Tauson won the Chicago Challenger, defeating Emma Raducanu in the final. At the US Open, she entered the main draw and won her first round match against Clara Burel from France while losing her second to world No. 1, Ashleigh Barty. Two weeks later, she won her second WTA title at the Luxembourg Open, beating the defending champion Jeļena Ostapenko in the final. Even though an injury kept her out of tournaments for the next two weeks, the points earned helped her to climb into the top 50. She ended the season as runner-up in the Courmayeur Open.

2022: Australian Open debut & back injuries
Tauson made her Australian Open main-draw debut as a senior defeating Astra Sharma in the first round. She then upset sixth seed Anett Kontaveit in straight sets marking her first top-ten win. She lost the following round to eventual runner-up Danielle Collins in three close sets thereby ending her so far best Grand Slam tournament. From February till March, Tauson played three WTA 1000 tournaments in a row: Qatar Open, Indian Wells and Miami Open. Qatar marked her WTA 1000 main-draw debut when she defeated Olympic champion Belinda Bencic in the first, round before losing to third seed Paula Badosa, in straight sets. In Indian Wells, she entered the second round as a seeded player and made it to the third round where she lost to eventual champion Iga Świątek, in three sets. In Miami, she retired in the first round against Zhang Shuai.

In Madrid, she lost in the first round. Later she withdrew from what could have been her fifth WTA 1000 tournament, the Italian Open, because of a back injury.  This also kept her out of the French Open. Likewise in Wimbledon, her next tournament, she had to withdraw in the first round.

At the Washington Open, she played and lost her first complete match since Wimbledon. Her first win since March came at the Thoreau Tennis Open against Katie Boulter. In US Open she lost in the first round against ninth seed Garbiñe Muguruza. In August, she played and lost three doubles matches: In Washington with Emma Raducanu, in Cleveland with Camila Osorio, and in Flushing Meadows with Ann Li as her partner. The same month she also passed her first million in prize money.

After being as low as 140 in the rankings in October, she returned to tournaments and top 100 in December when she reached the final in Limoges only to get a new injury, this time in the foot, which kept her out of the 2023 Australian Open. At the same time, she had to stop the co-operation with her coach since 2019 due to a lack of finances.

2023
She returned to tournaments at the end of January at the Lyon Open but failed in qualifying. Her first main-draw win came on 8th February as a lucky loser in Linz against third seed Irina-Camelia Begu.

Playing style
Tauson is a power baseliner. She is able to produce a high number of winners from her forehand and backhand side as well as overpower her opponents. She possesses a reliable serve and good movement on the court as well.

Performance timeline

Only main-draw results in WTA Tour, Billie Jean King Cup, Olympic Games and Grand Slam tournaments are included in win–loss records.

Singles
Current through the 2023 Linz Open.

Doubles
Current through the 2022 US Open.

WTA career finals

Singles: 3 (2 titles, 1 runner-up)

WTA Challenger finals

Singles: 2 (1 title, 1 runner-up)

ITF Circuit finals

Singles: 14 (11 titles, 3 runner–ups)

Doubles: 1 (runner–up)

Junior Grand Slam finals

Girls' singles: 1 (title)

Record against top 10 players
Tauson's record against players who have been ranked in the top 10. Active players are in boldface.

Top 10 wins

Billie Jean King Cup / Fed Cup participation

Notes

References

External links

  
 
 

2002 births
Living people
Danish female tennis players
Australian Open (tennis) junior champions
Grand Slam (tennis) champions in girls' singles
Sportspeople from Copenhagen